Renegades or The Renegades may refer to:

Books
 The Renegades by T. Jefferson Parker
 Renegades (novel), a 2017 novel by Marissa Meyer

Film and television 
 Renegades (1930 film), starring Myrna Loy
 Renegades (1946 film), starring Evelyn Keyes
 Renegades (1989 film), starring Kiefer Sutherland and Lou Diamond Phillips
 Renegades (2017 film), starring Sullivan Stapleton and J.K. Simmons
 Renegades (2022 film), starring Nick Moran
 G.I. Joe: Renegades, 2010–2011 G.I. Joe animated series
 Renegades (Gobots), the villains in the Gobots fiction and toy series
 The Renegades (TV series), 1983 American television series
 Star Trek: Renegades (2015), Star Trek fan film pilot

Music
 The Renegades (band), a 1960s British-Finnish rock band headed by Kim Brown
 Renegades (band), a side-project of the band Feeder

Albums
 Renegades (Rage Against the Machine album), 2000
 Renegades, a 1984 album by Brass Construction
 Renegades (Nicole Mitchell album), 2009
 Renegades (Feeder album), 2010
 Renegades (Equilibrium album), 2019
 Renegades, a 2020 album by L.A. Guns

Songs
 "Renegades" (Feeder song), 2010
 "Renegades" (X Ambassadors song), 2015

Podcasts
 Renegades: Born in the USA, 2021 podcast hosted by Barack Obama and Bruce Springsteen

Sports teams
 Detroit Renegades, Australian E-sports organization
 Bakersfield College, Renegades
 Berkshire Renegades (formerly the Reading Renegades), a British American football team
 Boston Renegades, US women's soccer team
 Dallas Renegades, an American football team
 Hudson Valley Renegades, US minor league baseball team
 Melbourne Renegades, Australian cricket team in Big Bash League
 Mt Riv Renegades, Australian basketball team
 Orlando Renegades, 1985 United States Football League team
 Ottawa Renegades, Canadian Football League team
 Richmond Renegades (1990–2003), US ECHL ice hockey team
 Renegades (esports), esports team based in the US
 Rome Renegades, US indoor football team (American football)
 Zurich Renegades, American football team from Zürich, Switzerland

See also
Renegade (disambiguation)